Lactifluus rugulostipitatus is a species of mushroom in the family Russulaceae. It was described by James K. Douch, Lachlan Tegart, Luke Vaughan, and Teresa Lebel in 2021. The specific epithet refers to the longitudinally wrinkled stipe that is characteristic of this species. The type locality is near Mount Bundey, Australia.

See also 
 
 List of Lactifluus species
 Fungi of Australia

References

External links 
 

Fungi described in 2021
Fungi of Australia
Lactifluus
Taxa named by Teresa Lebel